Roy Leonard Goulden (born 22 September 1937) is an English former professional footballer who played as an inside forward.

Career
Born in Ilford, Goulden is the son of ex-England international Len Goulden. He joined Arsenal in 1953, turned professional in September 1954, and made his debut in February 1959. After spells with Southend United and Ipswich Town, Goulden played non-league football with Stevenage, Gravesend & Northfleet and Dunstable Town.

References

1937 births
Living people
English footballers
Arsenal F.C. players
Southend United F.C. players
Ipswich Town F.C. players
Stevenage F.C. players
Ebbsfleet United F.C. players
Dunstable Town F.C. players
English Football League players
Association football inside forwards